The Kas Plateau Reserved Forest, also known as the Kaas Pathar, is a plateau situated 25 kilometres west from Satara city in Maharashtra, India. It falls under the Sahyadri Sub Cluster of the Western Ghats, and it became a part of a UNESCO World Natural Heritage Site in 2012.

It is a biodiversity hotspot known for various types of seasonal wild flowers bloom and numerous species of endemic butterflies annually in the months of August and September. The plateau is situated at an altitude of 1200 metres and is approximately 10 square kilometers in area. Kaas has more than 850 different species of flowering plants. These include orchids, shrubs such as the Karvy, and carnivorous plants such as Drosera Indica.
Kaas Pathar is a plateau made from volcanic rocks in the Satara district of Maharashtra, and comes under the biosphere of the Western Ghats. 
The flora of kaas i.e. the entire flowering plants and their related plants are typically restricted to that particular locality only. This is because the plateau is largely formed of basalt which is directly exposed to atmosphere. The basalt is almost covered entirely by a thin cover of soil formed due to erosion and has accumulated a layer of not more than 25 mm or so.

About
Kaas plateau is a plateau located near Satara. It is situated high hill plateaus and grasslands turns into a 'valley of flowers' during monsoon season, particularly from August to early October. Kaas Plateau has more than 150 or more types of flowers, shrubs and grasses. The orchids bloom here for a period of 3–4 weeks during this season. Kaas plateau is a World Natural Heritage site, part of the Sahyadri Sub-cluster. To control possible damage by tourists, the number of visitors to the plateau has been restricted to 3,000 per day. In September, some of the most common flowering plants are Eriocaulon spp., Utricularia spp., Pogostemon deccanensis, Senecio grahamii, Impatiens lawii and Dipcadi montanum.

The plateau experiences a natural cycle of extreme conditions, with wet water-logged cool monsoons, very dry hot summer (45 °C) and dry winter (5 °C). The soil is acidic only a thin layer on top of laterite rock underneath. Extreme seasonality influences the ecology of the site.

Geography
Kaas plateau is a plateau located around 25 km from Satara. There are two ways to reach Kaas. one the more direct way from Satara and another from Tapola via the link road connecting Mahabaleshwar and Panchgani to Kas Pathar. Kas plateau is 20 km away from Northern part of Koyana Sanctuary. The major portion of the plateau is reserve Forest. Kaas lake (built 100 years ago) is a perennial source of Water supply for western part of Satara city by gravity. The flora of Kaas are around the locality of that area. The plateau is largely formed of basalt which is directly exposed to atmosphere. The basalt rock is covered by a thin cover of soil formed due to erosion and has accumulated a layer of not more than an inch or so. This soil is neither black nor lateritic. At certain places water gets accumulated because of uneven surface. The plants growing on Kas plateau are typically of herbaceous nature of like grasses. The small shrubs and trees are located at the periphery of the plateau at Kaas plateau. The small shrubs and trees are located at the periphery of the plateau.

The various distances of Kas plateau are as follows:
 From Satara - 25 km
 From Pune - 125 km
 From Mumbai - 280 km
 From Kolhapur - 150 km
 From Sangli - 147 km

Biodiversity on Kaas plateau
Kaas Plateau is rich in its Bio-diversity. Many species are observed on plateau which are new to the Botanical Science. Many of the endemic, endangered plants are found on Plateau. More than 850 species of flowering plants are reported on the plateau. 624 species have entered in the Red Data Book. Out of these 624 species, 39 are found only in Kaas Region.

The main plateau of Kas has been surveyed in detail by many researchers. The other three plateaus have not been surveyed. Earliest work on the plateau was by Chavan et al. (1973). Dr. Bachulkar studied endemic flora of this area. Bhattarai et al. 2012  has identified 103 species of local concern on the Kas plateau and surrounding area. Lekhak and Yadav, 2012 have documented floristic wealth of the Kas plateau.

The vegetation and biodiversity values of the Kas plateau as a representative site of the threatened rocky plateau habitat has been discussed by Porembski and Watve (2005)  Watve (2007), 2010  One study has been published on the pollination mechanism (Hobbhahn et al., 2006 that includes field studies carried out on Kas.

A list of lichen species from Kas area has been compiled by Dr. Gayatri Chitale & Archana Dube during their doctoral studies from Maharashtra which includes 14 species of macro lichens and 6 species of micro lichens found on Kas plateau.

Chikane and Bhosale (2012) have compiled herpetofaunal list of the Kas area including 57 species. Photo documentation of spiders from Kas is available with Vishal Deshpande, Ranwata. List of birds (about 200+ species) has been compiled by Vikram Hoshing, Sanjay Thakur and many other bird watchers of the area. Fishes of Kas area are studied by Sunil Bhoite and Dr. Neelesh Dahanukar. Although a list of invertebrates has not been compiled, Dr. Hemant Ghate (Modern College, Shivajinagar, Pune) and his students have been recording faunal diversity of Kas for more than a decade. 
The pond has also been studied for microfossils by the Department of Geology, Agharkar Research Institute.

Many popular books have appeared in Marathi and English, including photoguides by Shrotri (2007), Shrikant Ingalhallikar (Flowers of Kas 2012), and another by Satara Forest department in 2012.

Herbaceous plant communities of this plateau were systematically surveyed during 2004-2006 as a part of Department of Science and Technology funded project on plant communities of rocky plateaus. In a sampling area of 25 sq.m, H’ =3.88 and 40 herbaceous species were reported in September 2004, followed by H’ =3.971 and 29 herbaceous species in September 2005, indicating rich herbaceous diversity.

Kas is type locality of following species

Flowering plant:
 Arisaema ghaticum (Sardesai, S.P.Gaikwad & S.R.Yadav) Punekar & Kumaran 
 Chrysopogon castaneus Veldkamp & Salunkhe
 Eriocaulon epedunculatum Potdar, Anil Kumar bis, Otaghvari and Sonkar 
 Eulalia shrirangii Salunkhe & Potdar
 Jansenella neglecta S.R.Yadav, Chivalkar & Gosavi 
 
Insects (Beetle): A new genus:
 Kashmirobia Konstantinov & Prathapan
A new genus & species:
 Kashmirobia hugeli Konstantinov & Prathapan 
 Chiridopsis nigropunctata Borowiec & Ghate 

In addition to this, following species have been rediscovered from Kas 
 Crinum brachynema reported by M. Bachulkar
 Dipcadi maharashtrensisreported by P. Tetali and others
 Cassida flavoguttata - Tortoise beetle rediscovered from Kas by Ghate et al., earlier known from the Nilgiris

Snake:
 Striped Coral Snake: Patteri Povala was rediscovered by Sahyadri Trekking Group

Kas is very famous for the mass blooming of Eriocaulon spp., Utricularia spp., Impatiens lawii and Smithia spp. All the typical microhabitats and species complexes of lateritic plateau are seen here.

The plateau also has several invertebrates throughout the year. Tiger beetles are observed mating in large numbers on Kas during September–October. Praying mantises, ants are common. Tadpole shrimps were reported some years back. Fairy shrimps are present in the small pond. 
The plateau has several signs of presence of barking deers, hares, civets and rodents. Gaur has been reported by Sunil Bhoite from Satara in 2012. Ruddy mongoose, Rusty spotted cat have been observed in surrounding scrub area. Presence of Leopard has been reported from the surrounding forest area. Endemic Malabar Lark is commonly observed nesting on the rocky plateau.

Other attractions
Bhambavli Flower Plateau, largest flower platea of the world is situated 3 km away from Kaas Plateau (reference - www. satara.gov.in). Kaas lake is on the south of the Kaas Plateau and is surrounded by dense forest. It lies between Sajjangad fort and the Kanher Dam. Koyna project is around 30 km towards the south of Kaas Lake.
Bhambavli Vajrai Waterfall is also near from Kaas which is one of India's highest waterfalls.

Flowers
The following is a list of some of the flowers found on at Kaas:

Gallery

Threats to the ecosystem
The plateau was always under local pressures of grazing and burning. Domestic cattle compete to a certain extent with wild mammals. Disturbance was also caused by the road that passes through the plateau. Many road kills of snakes have been reported. Addition of dung leads to eutrophication. Heavy trampling by cattle and people has created many paths on the plateau. It is not possible to judge the impact of these activities on the plateau diversity, as no baseline data is available. Recent popularity and sudden growth in tourism are at present the most serious threats, not only to the plateau but also to the surrounding areas. The alarming rise in the number of tourists became a serious concern since 2008. The easily visible ecological impacts of tourism are high levels of vegetation trampling, microhabitat damage and solid waste problem. The not so easily visible impacts are changing land-use in surrounding area, socio-economic and cultural changes in the surrounding villages. Both these are irreversible unless immediate measures are taken.
A Joint Forest Management Committee has been constituted to manage tourist inflow. The most serious threat is establishment of invasive weeds, which are introduced through foreign soils and can compete with the indigenous flora.

External links

 Website by the Satara division forest department

References

Hill stations in Maharashtra
Tourist attractions in Satara district
Plateaus of India
World Heritage Sites in India
Landforms of Maharashtra